
Gmina Wyszki  is a rural gmina (Polish:gmina wiejska) in Bielsk County, Podlaskie Voivodeship. It is located in north-eastern Poland.

Geography
Brańsk is located in the geographical region of Europe known as the Wysoczyzny Podlasko – Bialoruskie (English: Podlaskie and Belarus Plateau) and the mezoregion known as the Równina Bielska (Bielska Plain).

Location
It is located approximately: 
  northeast of Warsaw, the capital of Poland
  southwest of Białystok, the capital of the Podlaskie Voivodeship
  northwest of Bielsk Podlaski, the seat of Bielsk County

Climate
The region has a continental climate which is characterized by high temperatures during summer and long and frosty winters . The average amount of rainfall during the year exceeds .

Demographics
Detailed data as of 31 December 2007:

Municipal government
Its seat is the village of Wyszki.

Executive branch
The chief executive of the government is the Mayor (Polish: Wójt).

Legislative branch
The legislative portion of the government is the City Council (Polish: Rada) composed of the President (Polish: Przewodniczący), the Vice-President (Polish: Wiceprzewodniczący) and thirteen councilors.

Villages
The following villages are contained within the gmina:

Bogusze, Budlewo, Bujnowo, Falki, Filipy, Gawiny, Godzieby, Górskie, Ignatki, Kalinówka, Kamienny Dwór, Koćmiery, Kowale, Kożuszki, Krupice, Łapcie, Łubice, Łuczaje, Łyse, Malesze, Mierzwin Duży, Mierzwin Mały, Mieszuki, Moskwin, Mulawicze, Niewino Borowe, Niewino Kamieńskie, Niewino Leśne, Niewino Popławskie, Nowe Bagińskie, Nowe Warpechy, Olszanica, Osówka, Ostrówek, Pierzchały, Pulsze, Samułki Duże, Samułki Małe, Sasiny, Sieśki, Stacewicze, Stare Bagińskie, Stare Niewino, Stare Warpechy, Stare Zalesie, Strabla, Szczepany, Szpaki, Topczewo, Trzeszczkowo, Tworki, Wiktorzyn, Wodźki, Wólka Pietkowska, Wólka Zaleska, Wypychy, Wyszki, Zakrzewo, Zdrojki.

Neighbouring political subdivisions
Gmina Wyszki is bordered by the gminas of Bielsk Podlaski, Brańsk, Juchnowiec Kościelny, Poświętne and Suraż.

References 

Wyszki
Bielsk County